Alcidodes exornatus is a species of the true weevil family. It occurs in Papua New Guinea

References

 Universal Biological Indexer
 Zipcodezoo

Alcidinae
Beetles described in 1880
Arthropods of New Guinea